Nishada aurantiaca is a moth of the family Erebidae first described by Walter Rothschild in 1913. It is found on Sulawesi.

References

Lithosiina
Moths described in 1913